Tim Anders Junior Erlandsson (born 25 December 1996) is a Swedish footballer who plays as a goalkeeper for Falkenbergs FF.

Club career

Nottingham Forest
On 2 June 2015, Erlandsson signed a three-year contract with Nottingham Forest, for whose under-18 side he had spent a successful season on loan from Halmstads BK.

Loan spells
On 25 November 2016, Erlandsson signed a one-month loan deal with Barrow as cover for injured first-choice goalkeeper Joel Dixon. Erlandsson made his debut for Barrow the following day as his new club defeated Dagenham & Redbridge 4–1. In spite of efforts by Barrow to extend Erlandsson's loan spell, the goalkeeper returned to Forest on 25 December in order to experience football in a higher division. On 20 January 2017, Erlandsson was loaned to newly promoted Allsvenskan club AFC Eskilstuna until 5 November; the end of the Swedish football season. He made his league debut for the club on 2 April 2017 in a 3–1 away loss to GIF Sundsvall. After time back in Nottingham, Erlandsson again moved out on a one-month loan to National League North club Salford City on 16 March 2018. His league debut for the club came on 20 March 2018 in a 1–1 away draw with North Ferriby United.

In January 2019, Erlandsson parted ways with Forest to return to Sweden.

IK Frej
On 23 January 2019, Erlandsson joined Superettan team IK Frej.

Erlandsson opted to leave Frej in June 2019, without making a first-team appearance, and take a break from playing professional football due to mental health issues around anxiety.

Falkenbergs FF
On 29 November 2019, Erlandsson joined Falkenbergs FF ahead of their 2020 season in the Allsvenskan.

International career
In July 2016, Erlandsson was named to Sweden U23 that participated in the 2016 Summer Olympics.

Honours
Sweden U17
 FIFA U-17 World Cup Third place: 2013

References

External links
 

1996 births
Living people
Association football goalkeepers
Nottingham Forest F.C. players
Barrow A.F.C. players
AFC Eskilstuna players
Salford City F.C. players
IK Frej players
Falkenbergs FF players
Superettan players
Swedish footballers
Sweden youth international footballers
Footballers at the 2016 Summer Olympics
Olympic footballers of Sweden